La Crónica del Quindío is a regional daily newspaper based in Armenia, Colombia, and founded in 1991. It mostly services the Coffee-Growers Axis region of Colombia.

References

Publications established in 1991
Newspapers published in Colombia
Mass media in Armenia, Colombia
Spanish-language newspapers
1991 establishments in Colombia